Austroperipatus paradoxus is a species of velvet worm in the Peripatopsidae family. This species has 15 pairs of legs. Females of this species range from 7 mm to 80 mm in length, whereas males range from 6 mm to 36 mm.

References

Onychophorans of Australasia
Onychophoran species
Animals described in 1915